Kevin Bailey was a Democratic member of the Texas House of Representatives representing the 140th District in Houston, Texas from 1991 through 2008. He received $27,000
from TED PAC.
He was defeated by Armando Walle in the 2008 Democratic Primary.

References

Year of birth missing (living people)
Living people
Democratic Party members of the Texas House of Representatives
21st-century American politicians